17795 Elysiasegal, provisional designation , is a Nysian asteroid from the inner regions of the asteroid belt, approximately 5 kilometers in diameter. It was discovered on 20 March 1998, by the LINEAR team at Lincoln Laboratory's Experimental Test Site in Socorro, New Mexico, in the United States. The asteroid was named after Elysia Segal, a 2003 ISEF awardee.

Orbit and classification 

Elysiasegal orbits the Sun in the inner main-belt at a distance of 2.0–2.8 AU once every 3 years and 8 months (1,351 days). Its orbit has an eccentricity of 0.17 and an inclination of 2° with respect to the ecliptic. A first precovery was taken by the Near-Earth Asteroid Tracking program in 1996, extending the asteroid's observation arc by 2 years prior to its official discovery observation.

Naming 

This minor planet was named for Elysia Segal, American actress and first-place winner at the 2003 Intel International Science and Engineering Fair, for her research analyzing the use of proteoglycans as a potential biomarker for congenital hydrocephalus. The approved naming citation was published by the Minor Planet Center on 14 June 2004.

Physical characteristics 

Little is known about Elysiasegals size, composition, albedo and rotation. Based on its absolute magnitude of 14.5, its diameter is likely to be between 3 and 7 kilometers, assuming an albedo in the range of 0.05 to 0.25.

References

External links 
 3D-orbit for minor planet 17795 Elysiasegal
 Asteroid Lightcurve Database (LCDB), query form (info )
 Dictionary of Minor Planet Names, Google books
 Asteroids and comets rotation curves, CdR – Observatoire de Genève, Raoul Behrend
 Discovery Circumstances: Numbered Minor Planets (1)-(5000) – Minor Planet Center
 
 

017795
017795
Named minor planets
19980320